Pope Hyginus was the bishop of Rome from  138 to his death in  142. Tradition holds that during his papacy he determined the various prerogatives of the clergy and defined the grades of the ecclesiastical hierarchy.

Hyginus instituted godparents at baptism to assist the baptised during their Christian life. He also decreed that all churches be consecrated. He is said to have died a martyr, though no records verify this. The chronology of the early bishops of Rome cannot be determined with any degree of exactitude today.

History
According to the Liber Pontificalis, Hyginus was a Greek by birth. Irenaeus says that the gnostic Valentinus came to Rome in Hyginus' time, remaining there until Anicetus became pontiff.

Cerdo, another Gnostic and predecessor of Marcion of Sinope, also lived at Rome in the reign of Hyginus; by confessing his errors and recanting, he succeeded in obtaining readmission into the Church but eventually fell back into heresy and was expelled from the Church.
The Liber Pontificalis also relates that this pope organized the hierarchy and established the order of ecclesiastical precedence. This general observation recurs also in the biography of Pope Hormisdas, but has no historical value. According to Louis Duchesne, the writer probably referred to the lower orders of the clergy.

The ancient sources contain no information as to his having died a martyr. At his death he was buried on the Vatican Hill, near Saint Peter's tomb. His feast is celebrated on 11 January.

See also

List of popes

References

External links 

 Opera Omnia
 
 Fontes Latinae de papis usque ad annum 530 (Papa Felix IV)
  Liber pontificalis

140 deaths
2nd-century archbishops
2nd-century Christian saints
2nd-century Romans
Greek popes
Papal saints
Popes
Saints of Roman Athens
Year of birth unknown
2nd-century popes
Burials at St. Peter's Basilica